95.9 Radyo Bisdak (DXAQ 95.9 MHz) is an FM station owned and operated by Times Broadcasting Network Corporation. Its studios and transmitter are located at 2nd Floor, JM Building, Bonifacio St., Brgy. Central, Dipolog.

References

External links
Radyo Bisdak Dipolog FB Page

Radio stations established in 2016
Radio stations in Zamboanga del Norte